Gramps Is in the Resistance or Papy fait de la résistance is a French war comedy film directed by Jean-Marie Poiré in 1983.

Plot 
Héléna Bourdelle, a.k.a. "La Bourdelle", is a world-renowned opera singer and the wife of maestro André Bourdelle. They live in a luxurious hôtel particulier in Paris, with their three grown-up children—Bernadette, Colette and Guy-Hubert—and André's father, known as "Gramps". When Nazi Germany occupies France, André becomes a leader of a Resistance cell but he is killed by the accidental explosion of a grenade. Two years later, the family's mansion is requisitioned by the German occupation authorities to accommodate Wehrmacht General Hermann Spontz, transferred from Eastern Front to Paris. The Germans brutally take over the whole house and leave the family occupying the cellar, and complaining to the Kommandantur about the excesses of Spontz and his men. While in the Kommandantur, Madame Bourdelle, her daughter Bernadette and Michel Taupin, a tenant in the family house, help by chance the escape a British RAF airman, and are then forced to hide him in their cellar.

Michel Taupin woos without success Bernadette, after initially having views on Colette. His insistent desire to join the Resistance leads to many adventures. Imprisoned after the episode at the Kommandantur, he meets a resistant, Felix, who confides in him, thinking he is about to be shot by the Germans. When they are freed by an elusive vigilante known as "Super-Resistant", Felix finds himself unable to get rid of Michel.

The family is also persecuted by Adolfo Ramirez, the former Paris Opera caretaker and a fierce collaborationist who has become a Gestapo agent. Ramirez seeks to take revenge on the Bourdelles but they are protected by General Spontz, who is an admirer of Héléna Bourdelle and who has a soft spot for Bernadette. Ramirez finally discovers that Guy-Hubert, son of the family, a seemingly cowardly and effeminate hairdresser, is actually "Super-Resistant" and the boss of Felix, but Spontz does not believe him.

Although she had vowed not to sing while there were Germans in France, Madame Bourdelle is forced by General Spontz to attend a reception in honour of Hitler's half-brother, Marshal Ludwig von Apfelstrudel, held in a castle near Paris. With the help of Michel Taupin, the Resistance plans to detonate a bomb in the dining room. The operation fails and the Bourdelles and Taupin are about to be arrested but they are saved by Super-Resistant, who captures von Apfelstrudel and all the German generals, with the help of his men and of Gramps.

The story seems to end, but proves to be a "film within the film," and gives way to a contemporary television debate, designed to address the period of occupation, and to report on the reality of the depicted events in the film. The show brings together Bernadette Bourdelle and General Spontz (now happily married), Guy-Hubert, Adolfo Ramirez Jr. (son of Ramirez, who came from Bolivia to defend his father's memory), and Michel Taupin (now Minister of Veterans Affairs). Soon, the discussion turns to disaster: Ramirez Jr. insults and defames the other protagonists of the story, who start to beat him up on the TV set, forcing the host to cut the transmission.

Cast

 Christian Clavier as Michel Taupin, professor of Greek and Latin
 Michel Galabru as Jean-Robert Bourdelle "Gramps"
 Dominique Lavanant as Bernadette Bourdelle
 Jacqueline Maillan as Héléna Bourdelle
 Jacques Villeret as Ludwig Von Apfelstrudel, Hitler's half-brother
 Roland Giraud as General Hermann Spontz
 Gérard Jugnot as Adolfo Ramirez and Adolfo Ramirez Jr.
 Martin Lamotte as  Guy-Hubert Bourdelle / Super-Resistant
 Pauline Lafont as  Colette Bourdelle
 Jean Carmet as  André Bourdelle
 Julien Guiomar as  Colonel Vincent
 Josiane Balasko as the pharmacist
 Michel Blanc as Father Leboeuf, the priest
 Jean-Claude Brialy as tennis player sycophant
 Bernard Giraudeau as resistant arrested
 Jacques François as Jacques de Frémontel, "Félix"
 Thierry Lhermitte as SS Standartenführer
 Jean Yanne as militiaman Murat
 Roger Carel as General Muller
 Bruno Moynot as Flandu
 Jean Négroni as the narrator

References

External links
 

1983 films
1983 comedy films
French comedy films
1980s French-language films
Films about the French Resistance
Films directed by Jean-Marie Poiré
1980s French films